Black tie is a semi-formal dress code.

Black tie may also refer to:
Black Tie (band)
"Black Tie" (30 Rock), Season 1 2007 episode
"Black Tie", Law & Order Season 4 1993 episode
"Black Tie", 1986 song by Yellowjackets from Shades
 Black Tie (album)